Azeem Ahmed Tariq (died 1 May 1993) was a Pakistani politician who was the Chairman and one of the founding members of MQM  (Muhajir Qaumi Movement) and its student wing APMSO (All Pakistan Muttahidda Students Organization). The party was formed to fight for the rights of the Mohajir people in Sindh, who were immigrants from India during the Indo-Pakistan split.

Assassination 
Tariq was murdered in his Karachi home on May 1, 1993. At around 3 in the morning, intruders came into the house, picked his bedroom lock and fired multiple rounds as he slept on the floor of his drawing room. He is one of several MQM leaders and workers who have been killed over the years.

References

Assassinated Pakistani politicians
Year of birth missing
1993 deaths
Politicians from Karachi
Muttahida Qaumi Movement politicians